Ivittuut (formerly, Ivigtût) (Kalaallisut: "Grassy Place") is an abandoned mining town near Cape Desolation in southwestern Greenland, in the modern Sermersooq municipality on the ruins of the former Norse Middle Settlement.

Ivittuut is one of the few places in the world so far discovered to have naturally occurring cryolite (Na3AlF6, sodium aluminum fluoride), an important agent in modern aluminum extraction.

History 

The area was settled by about twenty farms of Norsemen, a district called the "Middle Settlement" by modern archaeologists from its placement between the larger Western and Eastern Settlements. It is the smallest and least well known of the three, and no written records of its residents survive, for which reasons it is believed to have been established last (and abandoned first) of the three. Investigations show a presence after 985 and with occupation continuing up to at least the 14th century.

The town's cryolite deposit was discovered in 1799, and the veins of silver-bearing lead surrounding it were mined by the British engineer J.W. Tayler before the silver content was found to be too low to make the operation viable. Danish engineers began mining the cryolite itself in 1859, and in 1864 the Danish Kriolit Mine og Handels Selskabet was granted a monopoly on its extraction. These early mines simply processed the cryolite for its direct aluminum content and for sale to the Pennsylvania Salt Manufacturing Company, which used it to create caustic soda.

The 1884 establishment of the Hall-Heroult process, which depends on the rare cryolite but dramatically improved the extraction of aluminum from bauxite ore, increased the deposit's importance. The Ivittuut mining operations were a major factor in the American occupation of Greenland during World War II. After World War II, the cryolite was mined by the Danish firm Kryolitselskabet Øresund, which helped fund the establishment of Grønlandsfly, today's Air Greenland.

Cryolite was eventually synthesized, reducing the importance of the mine. The mine ran empty, but production was proceeded using earlier 'waste rock'. The mine was finally shut down in 1987. The community was abandoned soon after.

In 1924, it was a stopping place for the first aerial circumnavigation, during which new engines were installed in two American biplane aircraft.

Climate

Summertime temperatures are cool with chilly nights, and wintertime temperatures are very cold with frigid nights.

Transport
Ivittuut and Kangilinnguit are connected by a road (which is roughly 5 km (3 mi) long).

See also
 History of Greenland

References 

Ghost towns in Greenland
Former populated places in Greenland
Norse settlements in Greenland
Populated places established in the 10th century
 
Mines in Greenland
Geological type localities